The following is a family tree for the Kings of the Hellenes of the House of Schleswig-Holstein-Sonderburg-Glücksburg, which ruled Greece between the election of Prince Wilhelm of Denmark (George I) to replace Otto of Greece in 1863 until the declaration of the Second Hellenic Republic in 1924, and again from 1935 until the abolition of the monarchy during the reign of King Constantine II in 1973. Those who ruled Greece are given in bold capitals.

Greek
Greek royalty